2,4,6-Heptanetrione is the organic compound with the formula .  It is a white or colorless solid.  The molecule, which exists mainly in the enol form, undergoes condensation with 1,2-diketones.  The compound contributes to the flavor of strawberries.  It forms a variety of metal complexes.

See also
Triacetylmethane, an isomer

Refercences

Triketones
Chelating agents
Ligands
3-Hydroxypropenals
Enols
Tridentate ligands